J. C. Scarff was an American football coach.  He was the first head football coach at the Cedarville University. He coached for the 1896 season only and compiled an undefeated 6–0–2 record.

Head coaching record

References

Year of birth missing
Year of death missing
Cedarville Yellow Jackets football coaches